A vibrating alert is a feature of communications devices to notify the user of an incoming connection or message. It is particularly common on mobile phones and pagers and usually supplements the ring tone. Most 21st-century mobile phones are fitted with a vibrating alert, as are smartwatches.

Vibrating alerts are primarily used when a user cannot hear the ring tone (a noisy environment or through hearing loss) or wants a more discreet notification (such as in a theatre). However, when the device is placed on a hard surface, it can often be as loud or louder than a ring tone. 

The vibrations are often produced by a small electric motor connected to an off-center weight.

See also
 Phantom vibration syndrome
 Smartwatch
 Vibrator (mechanical)

Mobile phones
Mechanical vibrations